Albert Schumberg (19 April 1909 – 16 January 1967) was a German swimmer. He competed in the men's 100 metre backstroke event at the 1928 Summer Olympics.

References

External links
 

1909 births
1967 deaths
German male swimmers
Olympic swimmers of Germany
Swimmers at the 1928 Summer Olympics
Sportspeople from Kiel
Male backstroke swimmers